Hibernian Hall may refer to:

in the United States 
Hibernian Hall (Charleston, South Carolina)
Hibernia Hall, Davenport, Iowa, also known as Hibernian Hall
St. Michael's Church, Cemetery, Rectory and Ancient Order of Hibernians Hall, Parnell, Iowa
Hibernian Hall (Boston, Massachusetts)
Ancient Order of Hibernians Hall, Anaconda, Montana, also known as Hibernian Hall
Wonder Ballroom, Portland, Oregon, also known and listed on the National Register of Historic Places as Hibernian Hall

in Australia
Hibernian Hall, Roma, a community hall in Roma, Maranoa Region, Queensland, Australia

See also
List of Hibernian buildings

Architectural disambiguation pages